Herbert Johnson "Tim" Louis (April 22, 1928 – February 16, 2016) was an American orthopedic surgeon and billionaire heir.

Early life
Herbert Johnson Louis was born on April 22, 1928, in Evanston, Illinois, the son of Henrietta Johnson Louis and John Jeffry  Louis, and the great grandson of the S. C. Johnson & Son company founder Samuel Curtis Johnson Sr. He was educated at Deerfield Academy, Williams College, and Northwestern University Medical School in Chicago. He served in the United States Army His brother John J. Louis Jr. (1925–1995), was the US Ambassador to the United Kingdom.

Career
Louis was an orthopedic surgeon. He helped to found the Phoenix Children's Hospital in the 1980s, and served on its board for many years. He founded the orthopedic surgery residency program at Maricopa Medical Center, and was an examiner for the American Board of Orthopaedic Surgery.

As of August 2015, he had a net worth of $2.7 billion.

Personal life
In 1950, Louis married Julie deLescaille, his college sweetheart. They had six children, Henry "Hank" Louis, Margaret "Peggy" Moreland, Clifton "Clif" Louis, Carrie Hulburd, Steven Samuel "Steve" Louis, and Timothy "Tim" Louis.

He died at his home in Paradise Valley, Arizona on February 16, 2016. He was survived by his wife Julie, their six children, 22 grandchildren, and 8 great-grandchildren.

References

1928 births
2016 deaths
People from Evanston, Illinois
People from Paradise Valley, Arizona
Military personnel from Illinois
Northwestern University alumni
Williams College alumni
Physicians from Arizona
American billionaires
Phillips family (New England)
Samuel Curtis Johnson family